Waterville is a Canadian community in Kings County, Nova Scotia. It is administratively part of the village of Cornwallis Square.

Located on the Cornwallis River, the community is located 15 kilometres west of Kentville and is home to a Michelin tire factory, as well as the provincial youth detention facility.

As of 2021, the population was 703.

Climate

Demographics 

References

Communities in Kings County, Nova Scotia
Designated places in Nova Scotia
General Service Areas in Nova Scotia